Bread and Cheese may refer to:

 Bread and Cheese Club, art and literary society in Melbourne, Australia
 Bread and Cheese Creek, Maryland, USA
 Bread and Cheese Revolt, 1491—92 folk uprising in North Holland
 Bread and Cheese Day, a Six Nations celebration in Canada